Flight Nurse (aka Angels Take Over and Angels over Korea) is a 1953 American  drama war film directed by Allan Dwan and stars Joan Leslie and Forrest Tucker. The film is largely based on the life of Lillian Kinkella Keil, one of the most decorated women in American military history. Flight Nurse begins with the dedication: "This picture is respectfully dedicated to that brave legion of military nurses who are serving with the armed forces of free nations all over the world. These angels of mercy – shoulder to shoulder, share the danger and hardships of free fighting men everywhere, with devotion above and beyond the call of duty."

Plot
During the Korean War, United States Air Force (USAF) nurse Lt. Polly Davis (Joan Leslie)  flies to Japan for her first assignment with the Medical Air Evacuation Unit. Hoping to be near her fiancé, helicopter pilot Capt. Mike Barnes (Arthur Franz), she meets her roommates, Lt. Ann Phillips (Jeff Donnell) and Lt. Kit Ramsa (Kristine Miller) at the nurses' quarters in Tachikawa, but has not seen Mike.

The other nurses tell Polly that "flight nurses never get their men." Chief nurse Capt. Martha Ackerman (Maria Palmer), sends them on their various assignments. Polly is taken to a C-47 transport aircraft to meet medical technician, Sgt. Frank Swan (James Holden), and the pilots, Captains Bill Eaton (Forrest Tucker) and Tommy Metcalf (Dick Simmons).

Her first images of war in Korea are jarring, but Polly quickly gains her composure to treat wounded men. Bill watches as Polly calmly saves a young man's life. He begins to fall in love with her. Back in Japan, Mike takes Polly on a date and talks about marriage, but he is called out on a mission. Later, Bill learns that Mike's helicopter with wounded men is overdue and attempts a rescue. During the flight, Polly learns of Mike's danger and is angry that Bill held back the information.

During their missions, Bill is there to comfort Polly during bombings and saves her life when she is almost killed rescuing a wounded soldier. When the U.S. Marines and the U.S. Army land at Inchon and take Seoul, 50,000 prisoners of war are freed. In a Seoul hospital, several released American prisoners tell that a captured Korean was in charge of killing Americans. Dog tags of dead soldiers are retrieved, including Mike's. When Polly learns of this, grieving and oblivious, she is nearly killed by "Bed Check Charlie," an enemy flier who drops nightly bombs, but Bill again saves her life.

Frank worries that Polly is near a breakdown and Bill talks to Ackerman, who grounds Polly. Later, after Kit reports Mike was found alive near the Chosin Reservoir but in a hospital, Ackerman sends Polly there in Bill's aircraft. On the flight, a crazed soldier opens the door which hits the stabilizer, causing a crash. Polly, trying to aid an unconscious soldier, is thrown forward violently and suffers a concussion.

After the crew loads the passengers into lifeboats, Bill takes Polly into the crew raft with him. As they wait for rescue, Polly is delirious but calls out for Mike. When they are rescued, Polly recuperates in the same hospital as Mike, who has been receiving regular care packages from his former hometown girl friend. When he is well enough to be shipped home, Mike again asks Polly to marry him. However, during her convalescence Polly has come to realize that she could not embrace a quiet life while she is needed in Korea, and suggests that Mike return home to his real love. Later, Polly rejoins Bill and the rescue team, ready to start a new life with him.

Cast

 Joan Leslie as Lt. Polly Davis
 Forrest Tucker as Capt. Bill Eaton
 Arthur Franz as Capt. Mike Barnes
 Jeff Donnell as Lt. Ann Phillips
 Ben Cooper as Pfc. Marvin Judd
 James Holden as Sgt.  Frank Swan
 Kristine Miller as Lt. Kit Ramsey
 Maria Palmer as Captain Martha Ackerman
 Dick Simmons as Lt. Tommy Metcalfe (as Richard Simmons)
 James Brown as Flight engineer
 Hal Baylor as Sgt. Jimmy Case

Production
The film's opening credits indicate that the Department of Defense and the United States Air Force contributed greatly to the production. The aircraft seen in Flight Nurse included the Douglas C-54 Skymaster, Douglas C-47 Skytrain and Sikorsky H-5 helicopter.

Captain Lillian Kinkella Keil served as a technical advisor for Flight Nurse which was based upon her experiences.

Reception
Fllight Nurse was critically reviewed at The New York Times. The review noted: "The resolute humanity of military flight nurses and the courage of the Air Force personnel, whose job it is to transport the war wounded and injured in defenseless helicopters and planes to medical stations, are deserving of a better tribute than they receive in Republic's "Flight Nurse," which opened at the Palace yesterday." Other reviews were more positive. One film critic described it as a thrilling film that "honors the courageous women who performed miracles of mercy above the clouds in evacuation of wounded GIs from Korean battlefields."

References

Notes

Bibliography

 Evans, Alun. Brassey's Guide to War Films. Dulles, Virginia: Potomac Books, 2000. .

External links
 
 

1953 films
American aviation films
Films scored by Victor Young
Films directed by Allan Dwan
American black-and-white films
Korean War aviation films
Republic Pictures films
Films about the United States Air Force
Films set in Japan
Japan in non-Japanese culture
American war drama films
1950s war drama films
1950s English-language films
1950s American films